Kalijan (also Romanized as Kalījān; also known as Kaladzha, Kāljān, Ohālja, and Ūhāljeh) is a village in Sina Rural District, in the Central District of Varzaqan County, East Azerbaijan Province, Iran. At the 2006 census, its population was 75, in 15 families.

References 

Towns and villages in Varzaqan County